Allu Venkata Satyanarayana was a 4-time MLA from Palakol. He contested as the Telugu Desam Party MLA candidate in 1983, 1985, 1989, 1994, 1999 and won in 1983, 1985, 1994, 1999 but lost in 1989 elections. He is the longest serving MLA of 17 years (4 terms) from Palakollu assembly constituency.

Political career

Early career
He started his political career in Communist Party of India (Marxist) as Bala sangam leader. Later he resigned and was elected as Ward Councillor independently in 1981 and continued as councillor until 1987.

Praja Rajyam Party
He joined Praja Rajyam Party and continued in party until it merged with Congress.

YSR Congress Party
He joined YSR Congress Party.

Other posts
He worked as Andhra Pradesh Agro based industries chairman in 1988 and Assembly text books committee chairman in 1999.

References

 
 

Living people
Members of the Andhra Pradesh Legislative Assembly
1940 births
People from West Godavari district
Telugu politicians
Telugu Desam Party politicians
20th-century Indian politicians
Politicians from Palakollu
YSR Congress Party politicians